The Augustinian Friary of the Most Holy Trinity was an Augustinian (Order of Saint Augustine (mendicants)) Roman Catholic Priory, founded c. 1259, by the family of Talbot on the south bank of the river, in what is now Crow Street, Dublin. At the time the priory was built, it was just outside the city walls. The Friary most likely followed the design of the parent priory Clare Priory in the town of Clare, Suffolk (England). The Friary was suppressed in 1540 when it was described as a "church with belfry, a hall and dormitory". The friars continued to operate in secret within the city. and there are several mentions of them in the city archives until the late 1700s when they consecrated a new church.

Very little is known of the Augustinian Friary, and the full extent of the friary lands and ancillary buildings have not yet been established, though the area contained by Temple Lane, Temple Bar, Fownes Street Upper and Cecilia Street, is believed to mark the boundaries of the friary. In 1281 Geoffrey FitzLeones and his wife Joanna made a gift of the rents of their lands to the Friary.

The site is shown on John Speed's map of 'Dubline' (1610)(number 11), has been partially excavated, and is listed on the National Monuments Service database, Those excavations revealed c. 70 burials of late 12th -14th century (1993), surviving remains of the friary on the east side of Cecilia House (1995 (test excavations)) and in 1996 excavations exposed a section of wall with a relieving arch and a corner tower.

Discussion
No description of the original friary exists, however, much detail exists on similar and contemporaneous Augustinian friaries in England. Archdall in his 'Monasticon'  states "This monastery was very considerable, erected on the banks of the River Liffey, and was the General College for all the Augustinian Friers in Ireland". The buildings alone covered one and a half acres, and would have followed the pattern of an English Augustinian friary, with a number of individual buildings around a courtyard, including a church, cloisters leading to a dining room, dormitory buildings, a kitchen, the Prior's house, with a building set aside for sick and elderly friars, a bakehouse, guesthouse, a house for students, a novitiate house and a house for lay brothers, a garden and also a farm.

References

External links
 Ireland: Dublin, Augnet.org

Augustinian monasteries in the Republic of Ireland
Archaeological sites in County Dublin
Monasteries dissolved under the Irish Reformation